Thomas Glancy (10 October 1894 – 11 February 1949) was a Scottish professional footballer who made nearly 500 appearances in the Scottish League for Cowdenbeath, Falkirk and St Johnstone. In 1923 he was a member of a squad organised by Third Lanark that toured South America.

Personal life 
Glancy was the cousin of footballer Lawrence Glancy and the father of junior footballer Watty Glancy.

Career statistics

Honours 
Falkirk

 Falkirk Infirmary Shield: 1914–15, 1919–20, 1920–21, 1921–22
 Stirlingshire Redding Pit Disaster Benefit Cup: 1923–24

Individual
 Cowdenbeath Hall of Fame

References 

1949 deaths
Scottish footballers
Falkirk F.C. players
Cowdenbeath F.C. players
St Johnstone F.C. players
Scottish Football League players
Association football inside forwards
1894 births
People from Cowdenbeath
Inverkeithing United F.C. players
Third Lanark A.C. players